Emir Abdelkader, Jijel  is a town and commune in Jijel Province, Algeria. According to the 1998 census it has a population of 31,870.

References

Emir Abdelkader is a county in Jijel that has been known as Strasbourg during the French colonisation period of Alegria.

External links
 Jijel news

Communes of Jijel Province